Vice Admiral Axel Gunnar Jedeur-Palmgren (4 November 1899 – 6 March 1996) was a Swedish Navy officer. Lagerman served as Vice Chief of the Royal Swedish Naval Materiel Administration (1950–1962).

Early life
Jedeur-Palmgren was born on 4 November 1899 in Gothenburg, Sweden, the son of sea captain Gustaf Palmgren and his wife Agda (née Lilljequist). He passed studentexamen in Gothenburg in  1918.

Career
Jedeur-Palmgren was commissioned as an officer in the Swedish Navy in 1921 with the rank of acting sub-lieutenant. He was a cadet officer at the Royal Swedish Naval Academy from 1927 to 1930 and was promoted to lieutenant in 1936. Jedeur-Palmgren then served as a teacher at the Royal Swedish Naval Staff College from 1937 to 1940 and from 1941 to 1944. He was promoted to commander in 1943 and was appointed Inspector of the Naval Artillery in 1944 and was promoted to captain in 1945 after being appointed head of the Weapons Department of the Royal Swedish Naval Materiel Administration the same year.

Jedeur-Palmgren was appointed head of the Karlskrona Shipyard (Karlskrona örlogsvarv) in Karlskrona in 1948 and in 1950 he was promoted to rear admiral and appointed Vice Chief of the Royal Swedish Naval Materiel Administration. In his capacity as Vice Chief of the Royal Swedish Naval Materiel Administration, Jedeur-Palmgren was a member of the Administration Board of the Swedish Armed Forces from 1954 to 1962. Under his leadership, the Naval Materiel Administration underwent a reorganization in connection with the 1946 military management investigation in order to achieve better adaptation to the technical development and the newbuilding plans in the 1950s. As chief, he contributed, among other things, to the introduction of a new navigation system. It was then that the Decca Navigator System in the Baltic Sea became a reality. During the 1950s, the salvage of the warship Vasa became relevant. Jedeur-Palmgren was strongly involved in the organization and financing of the salvage company, and through his care, donations were received for the first measures. He later joined the established Vasa Board (Vasanämnden) for coordination of matters concerning the salvage. Jedeur-Palmgren served as Vice Chief of the Naval Materiel Administration until 1962 when he retired from active service and was at the same time promoted to vice admiral.

In addition to his military commitments, Jedeur-Palmgren was an expert in the 1943 naval shipyard investigation, chairman of the Central Joint Consultation Board of the [Swedish] Armed Forces (Försvarets centrala företagsnämnd) from 1950 to 1960, of the Swedish Society for the Saving of Shipwrecked Persons from 1964 to 1973 and of the Stiftelsen Nationalfonden för sjökrigets offer ("National Fund Association for the Victims of the Naval War") from 1965 to 1974. Furthermore, he served as deputy chairman of the Swedish Board for Computing Machinery from 1950 to 1955 and the board of the Maritime Museum from 1951 to 1957. Jedeur-Palmgren was a member of the council of the National Swedish Defence Factories (Försvarets fabrikstyrelse) from 1945 to 1948, of Wasanämnden from 1959 to 1962, a member of the board of the Swedish National Defence Research Institute from 1950 to 1962, of the Swedish Shipping and Navy League (Föreningen Sveriges flotta) from 1951 to 1956 and of the Wasa Rediviva Foundation from 1963 to 1965.

Personal life
In 1925, he married Kristina Lilljequist (1904–1991), the daughter of Thorsten Lilljequist and Therese Bundsen. They had two children: Lennart (1927–2016) and Orvar (born 1931).

Death
Jedeur-Palmgren died on 6 March 1996 in Onsala, Sweden. He was interred on 29 April 1996 at Östra kyrkogården in Gothenburg.

Dates of rank
1921 – Acting sub-lieutenant
1923 – Sub-lieutenant
1936 – Lieutenant
1941 – Lieutenant commander
1943 – Commander
1945 – Captain
1950 – Rear admiral
1962 – Vice admiral

Awards and decorations

Swedish
   Commander Grand Cross of the Order of the Sword (6 June 1957)
   Knight of the Order of Vasa
  Swedish Auxiliary Naval Corps's Gold Medal
  Swedish Women's Voluntary Defence Organization's Gold Medal
  SthlmsfkGM

Foreign
   Commander of the Legion of Honour
   Grand Officer of the Order of Orange-Nassau

Honours
Member of the Royal Swedish Society of Naval Sciences (1939; honorary member in 1950)
Member of the Royal Swedish Academy of War Sciences (1944)

Bibliography

References

1899 births
1996 deaths
Swedish Navy vice admirals
Military personnel from Gothenburg
Members of the Royal Swedish Society of Naval Sciences
Members of the Royal Swedish Academy of War Sciences
Commanders Grand Cross of the Order of the Sword
Knights of the Order of Vasa